Chen Bolin (born 27 August 1983), also known as Wilson Chen, is a Taiwanese actor.

Early life and education
Chen was born on 27 August 1983. While in high school, Chen participated in the Taiwanese variety show  due to his similarity to Takeshi Kaneshiro. He attended Jinwen University of Science and Technology.

Career
Chen first gained attention with his debut film Blue Gate Crossing, which was screened at the Cannes Film Festival and received positive reviews. His supporting roles in Hong Kong films, such as The Twins Effect II, A Chinese Tall Story and Kung Fu Dunk pushed his stardom to regions beyond Taiwan.

Chen rose to prominence in 2011. He was nominated for the Best Actor award at the Deauville Asian Film Festival for his performance in the independent drama film Buddha Mountain. The same year, he won the Golden Bell Award for Best Actor with his memorable performance in the hit drama In Time with You. On January 6, 2012, Chen appeared in a Taiwanese game show, All Pass (based on FOX's game show Are You Smarter than a 5th Grader?) and became the only person to win the NT$100,000 (about US$3,300) grand prize; Chen faced the question during the taping, "Name the person who said the phrase: "There are three ups, on a pillow, a saddle, and the toilet.", to which he gave the correct answer Ouyang Xiu. When host Chang Hsiao-yen questioned Chen on how he got the answer, he recalled reading one of Xiu's books despite being unsure on what to give for the answer.

Chen won the "Outstanding Performance" award at the 2013 Chinese Film Media Awards for the romance film Snowfall in Taipei. The following year, he starred in the road trip comedy The Continent, directed by Han Han.

In 2015, Chen signed with BM+ Entertainment, for his foray into the Korean entertainment industry. The same year, he starred in 20 Once Again, the Chinese remake of the hit Korean film Miss Granny. The film grossed 32,350,000 USD and set the box office record for Korean-Chinese co-produced films.

Chen then starred in two Chinese-Korean co-productions - black comedy film Bad Guys Always Die opposite Son Ye-jin, and romantic comedy film Life Risking Romance with Ha Ji-won.

In 2016, Chen paired up with Song Ji-hyo in the Chinese version of We Got Married, a virtual reality program which pairs celebrities together as a couple. The same year, he joined the cast of Korean drama Monster.

In 2017, Chen starred in The Dreaming Man, a romantic comedy film produced by Disney.

Filmography

Film

Television series

Variety show

Discography

Awards and nominations

References

External links

Chen Bolin's official website

1983 births
21st-century Taiwanese male actors
Living people
Male actors from Taipei
Taiwanese male film actors
Taiwanese male television actors